Batman v Superman: Dawn of Justice (Original Motion Picture Soundtrack) is the soundtrack to the film of the same name composed by Hans Zimmer and Junkie XL. It was released on March 18, 2016, by WaterTower Music. The exclusive deluxe edition of the album contains five bonus tracks, entitled "Blood of My Blood", "Vigilante", "May I Help You, Mr. Wayne?", "They Were Hunters" and "Fight Night". The soundtrack also features the Eric Whitacre Singers.

The style elements from "Is She with You?" were used as the theme music for the subsequent Wonder Woman soundtrack, while a variation of the piece "Beautiful Lie" is used in the film Wonder Woman 1984.

Track listing
Many tracks featured in the film were not released with the official soundtrack in March 2016. These tracks were later released in the film's complete score nearly two years later, on March 6, 2018.

Source music not included or credited on the soundtrack

Personnel
Music from the soundtrack was performed by the Hollywood Studio Symphony. The orchestra was conducted by Nick Glennie-Smith and Junkie XL, while the choir, the Eric Whitacre Singers, was conducted by Gavin Greenaway. Additional music was provided by Andrew Kawczynski, Steve Mazzaro, and Benjamin Wallfisch.

Charts

Weekly charts

Year-end charts

References

External links
 Official site

2016 soundtrack albums
2010s film soundtrack albums
Hans Zimmer soundtracks
Junkie XL albums
WaterTower Music soundtracks
Batman film soundtracks
Superman soundtracks
DC Extended Universe soundtracks
Superhero film soundtracks